The Princeton Science Library is a book series of popular science written by scientists known for their popular writings and originally published by Princeton University Press.

Books include:

 Flatland: A Romance of Many Dimensions by Edwin Abbott Abbott (1884)
 The Aim and Structure of Physical Theory by Pierre Maurice Marie Duhem (1914, English tr., 1954)
 The Meaning of Relativity: Including the Relativistic Theory of the Non-Symmetric Field by Albert Einstein (1922)
 The Causes of Evolution by J.B.S. Haldane (1932)
 How to Solve It: A New Aspect of Mathematical Method by George Polya (1945)
 The Mathematician's Mind: The Psychology of Invention in the Mathematical Field by Jacques Hadamard (1945)
 Symmetry by Hermann Weyl (1952)
 Eye and Brain by Richard L. Gregory (1966)
 The Enjoyment of Math by Hans Rademacher and Otto Toeplitz (1966)
 Adaptation and Natural Selection: A Critique of Some Current Evolutionary Thought by George Christopher Williams (1966)
 The New Science of Strong Materials or Why You Don't Fall Through the Floor by J. E. Gordon (1968)
 The Logic of Life: A History of Heredity by François Jacob (1976)
 Why Big Fierce Animals Are Rare: An Ecologist's Perspective by Paul A. Colinvaux (1978)
 Hands by John R. Napier (1980), edited by Russell H. Tuttle (1993)
 The Laws of the Game: How the principles of nature govern chance by Manfred Eigen and Ruthild Winkler (1981)
 Infinity and the Mind: The Science and Philosophy of the Infinite by Rudy Rucker (1982)
 The Evolution of Culture in Animals by John Tyler Bonner (1983)
 Neuronal Man by Jean-Pierre Changeux (1983)
 QED: The Strange Theory of Light and Matter by Richard P. Feynman (1985)
 Time Frames: The Evolution of Punctuated Equilibria by Niles Eldredge (1985)
 Fearful Symmetry: The Search for Beauty in Modern Physics by Anthony Zee (1986 1st ed) (1997 2nd ed)
 A View of the Sea: A Discussion between a Chief Engineer and an Oceanographer about the Machinery of the Ocean Circulation by Henry M. Stommel (1987)
 Encounters with Einstein: And Other Essays on People, Places, and Particles by Werner Heisenberg (1989)
 The Quantum World by John C. Polkinghorne (1989)
 Atom and Void: Essays on Science and Community by J. Robert Oppenheimer (1989)
 Chance and Chaos by David Ruelle (1991)
 The Miner's Canary: Extinctions Past and Present by Niles Eldredge (1991)
 Liquid Crystals: Nature's Delicate Phase of Matter by Peter J. Collings (1991)
 100 Billion Suns: The Birth Life and Death of the Stars by Rudolf Kippenhahn (1993)
 "e": The Story of a Number by Eli Maor (1994)
 Designing the Molecular World: Chemistry at the Frontier by Philip Ball (1994)
 The Supernova Story by Laurence Marschall (1994)
 The Garden in the Machine: The Emerging Science of Artificial Life by Claus Emmeche (1994)
 A Natural History of Shells by Geerat J. Vermeij (1995)
 Total Eclipses of the Sun by Jack B. Zirker (1995)
 The Nature of Space and Time by Stephen W. Hawking and Roger Penrose (1996)
 Celestial Encounters: The Origins of Chaos and Stability by Florin Diacu and Philip Holmes (1996)
 A Guide to Fossils by Helmut Mayr (1996)
 T. Rex and the Crater of Doom by Walter Alvarez (1997)
 How the Leopard Changed Its Spots: The Evolution of Complexity by Brian Goodwin (1997)
 ecology and evolution of Darwin's finches by Peter R. Grant (1999)
 Trigonometric Delights by Eli Maor (2002)
 The Extravagant Universe: Exploding Stars, Dark Energy, and the Accelerating Cosmos by Robert P. Kirshner (2002)
 Journey from the Center of the Sun by Jack B. Zirker (2004)
 Life on a Young Planet: The First Three Billion Years of Evolution on Earth by Andrew H. Knoll (2004)
 Plows, Plagues and Petroleum: How Humans Took Control of Climate by William F. Ruddiman (2005)
 Primates and Philosophers: How Morality Evolved by Frans de Waal (2006)
 The Pythagorean Theorem: A 4,000-Year History by Eli Maor (2007)
 Dr. Euler's Fabulous Formula: Cures Many Mathematical Ills by Paul J. Nahin (2011)

References

Series of books